Trachelipus ater is a species of woodlouse in the genus Trachelipus belonging to the family Trachelipodidae that is endemic to Romania.

References

External links

Trachelipodidae
Endemic fauna of Romania
Woodlice of Europe
Crustaceans described in 1896